Spodnja Ložnica is a village in the Municipality of Slovenska Bistrica in northeastern Slovenia. The area is part of the traditional region of Styria. It is now included with the rest of the municipality in the Drava Statistical Region.

A small chapel with a small wooden belfry in the centre of the settlement was built in 1890 on the site of an earlier smaller chapel.

References

External links
Spodnja Ložnica at Geopedia

Populated places in the Municipality of Slovenska Bistrica